Chromobox protein homolog 1 is a protein that in humans is encoded by the CBX1 gene.

Function 

The protein is localized at heterochromatin sites, where it mediates gene silencing.

Model organisms 

Model organisms have been used in the study of CBX1 function. A conditional knockout mouse line, called Cbx1tm1a(EUCOMM)Wtsi was generated as part of the International Knockout Mouse Consortium program — a high-throughput mutagenesis project to generate and distribute animal models of disease to interested scientists — at the Wellcome Trust Sanger Institute.

Male and female animals underwent a standardized phenotypic screen to determine the effects of deletion. Twenty two tests were carried out and two phenotypes were reported. No homozygous mutant animals survived until two weeks of age, therefore the remaining tests were carried out on heterozygous mutant mice. Male heterozygotes showed increased VO2, rate of elimination of carbon dioxide, and energy expenditure as determined by indirect calorimetry.

Interactions 

CBX1 has been shown to interact with:

 C11orf30,
 CBX3 and
 CBX5,  and
 SUV39H1.

See also 
 Heterochromatin protein 1

References

Further reading

External links 
 
 

Transcription factors
Genes mutated in mice